Antonio Peter De la Rosa (born January 17, 1979) better known by his stage name Omega "El Fuerte" or simply Omega, is a Dominican singer and songwriter. He is a modern day merengue artist based in Santo Domingo, Dominican Republic. Since 2007, Omega has enjoyed increased popularity in the Dominican Republic and with Dominican-Americans across the United States. He has also penetrated music markets in Spain, Italy and Latin America.

Omega has helped create and popularize a new form of merengue, called merengue urbano or merengue de calle. It is a blend of merengue with hip hop and R&B. This new genre has been adopted by many artists from diverse backgrounds such as Cuban-American Pitbull and Colombian-born Shakira.

Musical career
Peter De la Rosa began developing his musical talent at a young age, by 13 years of age he formed his first rap group. Afterward he began appearing on variety TV shows in the Dominican Republic and won several singing competitions as part of the group Alpha y Omega, from which he derives his stage name. Later on Omega formed the band Omega y Su Mambo Violento, which in 2005 released its first album titled Omega y Su Mambo Violento on the label Allegro Music. The album spawned his break-out hit, "Alante Alante." This was followed by a Casandra Award, given in the Dominican Republic in 2009. Omega then attended his first Latin Grammy Awards in 2010 and also performed at Presidente Beer's Festival of Latin Music in 2010, both events were pivotal to his international recognition. Also in 2010, Omega was able to tour the United States and performed in New York City's Manhattan Armory and at Elizabeth, New Jersey's Ritz theater, to name a few venues. Omega's continued popularity led to his being signed by Akon, through his record label Konvict Musik in 2011. Akon has confessed that Omega has helped him to conquer the Dominican market. Akon has also influenced Omega's music leading to Merengue with an Electronic blend as can be heard in Omega's 2012 hit, "Merengue Electronico."

Personal life
Omega was born Antonio Peter De la Rosa in the town of Bonao, Dominican Republic, the son of Ercilia De La Rosa and Sergio Peter. He grew up in the Pantoja neighborhood of Santo Domingo. Omega is currently married to Miguelina Sanchez; they have two daughters, Alejandra and Mariela Sanchez.

Legal issues

Peter De la Rosa's musical career has been marred by multiple encounters with authorities in Dominican Republic. He has been arrested on several occasions for failing to pay child support, domestic violence, and breach of contract.

Discography

Studio albums

Solo

As featured performer

Notes

References

People from Santo Domingo
21st-century Dominican Republic male singers
Dominican Republic songwriters
Dominican Republic rappers
Merengue musicians
Latin music songwriters
1979 births
Living people